Im Ha-ryong (born Im Han-yong on October 31, 1952) is a South Korean actor and comedian. During the 1980s and 1990s, Im was one of Korea's foremost comedians (called "gag men") alongside Shim Hyung-rae and Kim Hyung-gon. As his brand of comedy became less popular among younger viewers, Im started appearing in small supporting roles in films and television series, particularly those directed by Jang Jin. In 2005, he won Best Supporting Actor at the Blue Dragon Film Awards for his first major film role as a veteran soldier in the hit Korean War dramedy Welcome to Dongmakgol. Other notable films include workplace/musical drama Bravo My Life (2007) and political satire Good Morning President (2009).

Filmography

Film

Television series

Web series

Variety show

Music video

Theater

Awards and nominations

References

External links
Im Ha-ryong at Bel Actors Entertainment 

1952 births
Living people
South Korean male film actors
South Korean male television actors
South Korean male comedians
Hanyang University alumni